Marc Rademacher (born 12 October 1990) is a German bobsledder.

He participated at the IBSF World Championships 2017, winning a bronze medal and at the IBSF World Championships 2019, winning a gold medal, both in the Mixed team competition.

References

External links

German male bobsledders
1990 births
Living people